The 1965 Piccadilly World Match Play Championship was the second World Match Play Championship. It was played from Thursday 14 to Saturday 16 October on the West Course at Wentworth. Eight players competed in a straight knock-out competition, with each match contested over 36 holes. The champion received £5,000 out of a total prize fund of £16,000. Gary Player defeated Peter Thomson 3 & 2 in the final to win the tournament.

In the first round of his semi-final, Gary Player was 1 up after 10 holes but then lost seven holes in succession to Tony Lema from the 11th to the 17th. He needed a 10-foot putt at the 18th to halve that hole but was 6 down at lunch. He then lost the first hole in the afternoon to go 7 down to Lema. Player birdied the 2nd and 3rd holes and eventually won the 18th to tie the match, winning the match at the 37th hole.

In the final, Thomson was 1 up at lunch. Player squared the match at the 2nd hole and then went two up after winning the 7th and 8th. Thomson eagled the 12th to reduce the gap to one hole but Player birdied the 15th and 16th to win 3 & 2.

As in 1964, the match play championship was preceded by the Piccadilly Tournament, a 72-hole stroke play competition, which was played on the East Course on 11 and 12 October. The winner was Peter Butler who won £750.

Course
Source:

Scores
Source:

The match between Peter Thomson and Christy O'Connor was completed on 15 October having been all square after 36 holes when it became too dark to continue.

Prize money
The winner received £5,000, the runner-up £3,000, the losing semi-finalists £2,000 and the first round losers £1,000, making a total prize fund of £16,000.

References

Volvo World Match Play Championship
Golf tournaments in England
Piccadilly World Match Play Championship
Piccadilly World Match Play Championship
Piccadilly World Match Play Championship